Mulberry Creek is a  waterway in central Alabama, United States.  It rises in Chilton County and farther downstream forms the boundary between Dallas and Autauga counties.  It is a tributary of the Alabama River.

References

Rivers of Alabama
Rivers of Dallas County, Alabama
Rivers of Autauga County, Alabama